GTP-binding protein Rit2 is a protein that in humans is encoded by the RIT2 gene.

RIN belongs to the RAS (HRAS; MIM 190020) superfamily of small GTPases (Shao et al., 1999).[supplied by OMIM]

RIT2 has been associated with Parkinson's disease in two large genetic studies. An gene expression study of postmortem brain has suggested RIT2 interacts with interferon-γ signalling.

Interactions 

RIT2 has been shown to interact with POU4F1.

References

Further reading